The Way Sound Leaves a Room is the second EP and third release by Texas musician Sarah Jaffe. The EP consists of eight songs recorded in Jaffe's home in Denton, Texas. Two songs are covers, one is a different version of a song from her first album Suburban Nature, one is an outro version of a song from her debut, and the remaining four are demo versions of songs that might appear on her second full-length album. This EP steps away from Jaffe's acoustic sound and moves in more of an electric sound. She stated this EP was more of a transition piece to lead into her second studio album.
The CD version come packaged with a DVD of Jaffe's live show at the Wyly Theater.  "A Sucker for Your Marketing" was released as the first single from the EP.

Track listing 
CD
 Shut It Down 
 Louder Than Ever
 Clementine (alternate version)
 Better Than Nothing (outro-demo)
 The Way Sound Leaves a Room (demo)
 When You Rest (demo)
 A Sucker For Your Marketing (demo)
 All That Time (demo)

DVD
 The Way Sound Leaves a Room (opening)
 When You Rest (live)
 Nurture It (live)
 A Sucker For Your Marketing (live)
 Vulnerable (live)
 Hang With Me (live)
 All That Time (live)
 Clementine (live)
 Stay With Me (live)
 Before You Go (live)
 All That Time (closing)

References 

2011 EPs
Sarah Jaffe albums